Zanè is a town in the province of Vicenza, Veneto, Italy. It is north and south of SP349. As of 2007 Zanè had an estimated population of 6,553.

Sources
(Google Maps)

Cities and towns in Veneto